Tremoctopus is a genus of pelagic cephalopods, containing four species that occupy surface to mid-waters in subtropical and tropical oceans. They are commonly known as blanket octopuses, in reference to the long, transparent webs that connect the dorsal and dorsolateral arms of the adult females. The other arms are much shorter and lack webbing.

Description 
The common blanket octopus (Tremoctopus violaceus) exhibits one of the most extreme sexual size-dimorphism known in any animal near its size or larger. Females may reach  in length, whereas the males are 2.4 cm (1 inch). The weight ratio is at least 10,000:1, and can probably reach as much as 40,000:1. The males have a large arm in a spherical pouch modified for mating, known as a hectocotylus. During mating, this arm is detached, and kept by the female in her mantle cavity until used for fertilisation. The male almost certainly dies shortly after mating. There is competition between the males; multiple male arms have been found in the mantle cavity of females. The females carry more than 100,000 eggs attached to a sausage-shaped calcareous secretion held at the base of the dorsal arms and carried by the female until hatching.

Blanket octopodes are immune to the venomous Portuguese man o' war, whose tentacles the male and immature females rip off and use for offensive and defensive purposes. Like many other octopuses, the blanket octopus uses ink to intimidate potential predators. Also, when threatened, the female unfurls her large net-like membranes that spread out and billow in the water, greatly increasing her apparent size.

Blanket octopuses live in coral reefs, where they hunt for food. Their diet consists of smaller fish, and most of their prey can be found in or near coral reefs. They also hide from their predators in the reef, including larger fish and whales. The Blanket Octopus relies heavily on coral reefs, which are facing immense danger due to anthropogenic climate change. The risks these reefs face include coral bleaching and ocean acidification. Although this can be dangerous to the Blanket Octopus because it is their habitat, these creatures are nomadic meaning they can move around and find shelter elsewhere, and they also have the capability to adjust to varying temperatures within the ocean, providing two defense mechanisms that protect them from the effects of climate change.

Species
Tremoctopus gelatus, gelatinous blanket octopus
Tremoctopus robsoni
Tremoctopus gracilis, palmate octopus
Tremoctopus violaceus, common blanket octopus or violet blanket octopus

Notes

References

External links

Octopuses
Taxa named by Stefano delle Chiaje